The 1961–62 Spartan League season was the 44th in the history of Spartan League. The league consisted of 14 teams.

League table

The division featured 14 teams, all from last season.

References

1961-62
9